Neuronal-specific septin-3 is a protein that in humans is encoded by the SEPT3 gene.

Function 

This gene belongs to the septin family of GTPases. Members of this family are required for cytokinesis. Expression is upregulated by retinoic acid in a human teratocarcinoma cell line. The specific function of this gene has not been determined. Alternative splicing of this gene results in multiple transcript variants.

References

Further reading